Nicholas "Nico" Musoke (born April 5, 1986) is a Swedish mixed martial artist who competes in the middleweight division of Swedish promotion Superior Challenge. A professional mixed martial artist since 2007, Musoke has also competed in the Ultimate Fighting Championship.

Mixed martial arts career

Early career
Musoke began his MMA career as an amateur in 2005 taking on Jasper Gunnarsson in a losing effort via split decision. He then made his pro debut two years later at Shooto Finland against Tomi Hietanen. He won via rear-naked choke in the first round. Nico then won his following three fights ending all of them in the first round with two of them ending in less than 50 seconds.

Musoke suffered his first professional loss at the hands of future BAMMA and UFC fighter Danny Mitchell, via armbar in the second round. He bounced back from the loss with a TKO win over Wiktor Sobczyk at BOB 3.

On June 18, 2011, he took part in a four-man tournament held by On Top Promotions where the winner would leave as the OTP Welterweight champion.
In the first fight he suffered his second career loss, this time by decision against future Cage Warriors Welterweight Champion and fellow future UFC fighter Cathal Pendred.
However, before the final could take place Pendred was forced out due to injury. Musoke took his place and defeated another fellow future UFC fighter in Stevie Ray by submission due to a rear naked choke at the end of the first round to become the OTP Welterweight champion.

Since then Musoke had gone 4-0 (1) in his last 5 fights, including one defense of his OTP-title, before getting the call from the UFC.

Ultimate Fighting Championship
Musoke moved to Middleweight to make his UFC debut against long time UFC veteran Alessio Sakara, filling in for the injured Magnus Cedenblad at UFC Fight Night 30. He won the fight in the first round via armbar. He earned Submission of the Night honors.

Musoke dropped back to welterweight and faced Viscardi Andrade on February 15, 2014, at UFC Fight Night 36. Despite being dropped and almost finished in the first round by Andrade, Musoke was able to recover quickly and take control of the fight, rocking Andrade on their feet in round 2 and control the action on the ground in round 3. His performance earned him the unanimous decision victory.

On June 28, 2014, Musoke fought Kelvin Gastelum at UFC Fight Night 44 in San Antonio, Texas. Prior to the fight, Gastelum missed weight by one and three-quarter pounds and forfeited 20% of his fight purse to Musoke. After a good and fairly dominant first round from Musoke, Gastelum rallied to win the next two rounds convincingly resulting in a unanimous decision loss for Musoke.

Musoke was briefly linked to a bout with Amir Sadollah on October 4, 2014, at UFC Fight Night 53.  However, Sadollah was pulled from the pairing with Musoke in favor of a bout with Yoshihiro Akiyama on September 20, 2014, at UFC Fight Night 52.  Musoke instead faced Alexander Yakovlev. He won the fight by unanimous decision.

Musoke faced Albert Tumenov on January 24, 2015, at UFC on Fox 14. He lost the fight by unanimous decision.

After an extended hiatus, Musoke returned to face Bojan Veličković on May 28, 2017, at UFC Fight Night 109. In a back-and-forth fight, he lost by knockout in the last minute of the third round when Veličković connected with a right hook to the temple, causing Musoke to become wobbled and fall to the ground .

Post-UFC career
On September 12, 2018 - over a year after his last fight in the UFC - it was announced that Musoke had signed a contract with his native Superior Challenge and will be moving up to middleweight. In his promotional return, Musoke faced Daniel Acácio at Superior Challenge 18 on December 1, 2018. He won the fight via unanimous decision.

Musoke then fought for the Superior Challenge Middleweight Championship against Dylan Andrews at Superior Challenge 19 on May 11, 2019. He won the fight via unanimous decision and claimed the title.

As the first title defense, Musoke faced Marcelo Alfaya at Superior Challenge 20 on December 7, 2019. He successfully defended the title by winning the bout via unanimous decision.

Championships and accomplishments
Ultimate Fighting Championship
Submission of the Night (One time) vs. Alessio Sakara
Superior Challenge
SC Middleweight Championship (One time; Current)
One successful title defense
On Top Promotions
OTP Welterweight Championship (One time)
One successful title defense
OTP 2011 Welterweight Tournament winner 
Nordic MMA Awards - MMAViking.com
2013 Breakthrough Fighter of the Year

Mixed martial arts record

|- 
|Win
|align=center|16–5 (1)
|Marcelo Alfaya
|Decision (unanimous)
|Superior Challenge 20
|
|align=center|3
|align=center|5:00
|Stockholm, Sweden 
|
|- 
|Win
|align=center|15–5 (1)
|Dylan Andrews
|Decision (unanimous)
|Superior Challenge 19
|
|align=center|3
|align=center|5:00
|Stockholm, Sweden 
|
|- 
|Win
|align=center|14–5 (1)
|Daniel Acácio
|Decision (unanimous)
|Superior Challenge 18
|
|align=center|3
|align=center|5:00
|Stockholm, Sweden
|
|-
|Loss
|align=center|13–5 (1)
|Bojan Veličković
|KO (punches)
|UFC Fight Night: Gustafsson vs. Teixeira
|
|align=center|3
|align=center|4:37
|Stockholm, Sweden
|
|-
|Loss
|align=center|13–4 (1)
|Albert Tumenov
|Decision (unanimous)
|UFC on Fox: Gustafsson vs. Johnson
|
|align=center|3
|align=center|5:00
|Stockholm, Sweden
|
|-
|Win
|align=center|13–3 (1)
|Alexander Yakovlev
|Decision (unanimous)
|UFC Fight Night: Nelson vs. Story
|
|align=center|3
|align=center|5:00
|Stockholm, Sweden
|
|-
|Loss
|align=center|12–3 (1)
|Kelvin Gastelum
|Decision (unanimous)
| UFC Fight Night: Swanson vs. Stephens
| 
|align=center|3
|align=center|5:00
| San Antonio, Texas, United States
|
|-
| Win
|align=center| 12–2 (1)
|Viscardi Andrade
| Decision (unanimous)
|UFC Fight Night: Machida vs. Mousasi
|
|align=center|3
|align=center|5:00
|Jaraguá do Sul, Brazil
|
|-
| Win
|align=center| 11–2 (1)
|Alessio Sakara
|Submission (armbar)
|UFC Fight Night: Machida vs. Munoz
|
|align=center|1
|align=center|3:07
|Manchester, England
|
|-
| Win
|align=center| 10–2 (1)
|Alexander Landaeta Utrera
| Decision (unanimous)
|Golden Ring: Wallberg vs. Prazak
|
|align=center|3
|align=center|5:00
|Stockholm, Sweden
|
|-
| NC
|align=center| 9–2 (1)
|Mickaël Lebout
|No Contest (judging error)
|Vision FC 5: Finale
|
|align=center|3
|align=center|5:00
|Stockholm, Sweden
|
|-
| Win
|align=center| 9–2
|Dean Caldwell
| TKO (punches)
|OTP: On Top 5
|
|align=center|1
|align=center|3:49
|Glasgow, Scotland
|
|-
| Win
|align=center| 8–2
|Kai Puolakka
| Submission (guillotine choke)
|Cage 18: Turku
|
|align=center|3
|align=center|1:39
|Turku, Finland
|
|-
| Win
|align=center| 7–2
|Olli Jaakko Uitto
| Decision (unanimous)
|Cage 16: 1st Defense
|
|align=center|3
|align=center|5:00
|Espoo, Finland
|
|-
| Win
|align=center| 6–2
|Stevie Ray
| Submission (rear-naked choke)
|OTP: On Top 2
|
|align=center|1
|align=center|4:56
|Glasgow Scotland
|
|-
| Loss
|align=center| 5–2
|Cathal Pendred
| Decision (unanimous)
|OTP: On Top 2
|
|align=center|2
|align=center|5:00
|Glasgow, Scotland
|
|-
| Win
|align=center| 5–1
|Wiktor Sobczyk
| TKO (punches)
|Battle of Botnia 3
|
|align=center|2
|align=center|2:08
|Umeå, Sweden
|
|-
| Loss
|align=center| 4–1
|Danny Mitchell
| Submission (armbar)
|Superior Challenge 6 
|
|align=center|2
|align=center|1:56
|Stockholm, Sweden
|
|-
| Win
|align=center| 4–0
|Premysl Nemec
| TKO (punches)
|Superior Challenge 5
|
|align=center|1
|align=center|0:49
|Stockholm, Sweden
|
|-
| Win
|align=center| 3–0
|Jeppe Fausing
| KO (punch)
|Fighter Gala 9
|
|align=center|1
|align=center|0:12
|Elsinore, Denmark
|
|-
| Win
|align=center| 2–0
|Fredrik Klingsell
| Submission (rear-naked choke)
|The Zone FC 1 
|
|align=center|1
|align=center|1:16
|Stockholm, Sweden
|
|-
| Win
|align=center| 1–0
|Tomi Hietanen
| Submission (rear-naked choke)
|Shooto Finland: Chicago Collision 3
|
|align=center|1
|align=center|3:47
|Lahti, Finland
|
|-

See also
 List of current UFC fighters
 List of male mixed martial artists

References

External links
 
 

Living people
1987 births
Swedish male mixed martial artists
Middleweight mixed martial artists
Welterweight mixed martial artists
Mixed martial artists utilizing Brazilian jiu-jitsu
Swedish practitioners of Brazilian jiu-jitsu
Sportspeople from Stockholm
Ultimate Fighting Championship male fighters